Wilhelm Lee Friedell (August 22, 1883 – January 27, 1958), was a Rear Admiral in the United States Navy. Friedell was in command of the U. S. Naval Submarine Forces in European Waters during World War I, and was the commander of COMSUBPAC prior to the start of World War II. 

Wilhelm Lee Friedell graduated from the United States Naval Academy with the class of 1905. Still aboard the Kentucky, Friedell took part in the Second Occupation of Cuba and in 1908 he took part in the voyage of the Great White Fleet. He was transferred to the  where he served in the South China Sea as part of the Yangtze Patrol. Friedell took command of the  January 1910 and continued the Yangtze Patrol until October 1911. While serving aboard the New Orleans he led a landing party at Nanking during the 1911 Revolution to protect the American Consulate. He was then assigned to the Naval Academy as an instructor from March 1912 until April 1914. He held this command from June 1914 until September 1916. Following the war, Friedell led the Submarine Repair Division at the Philadelphia Navy Yard before returning to Annapolis as an instructor. He then assumed command of the submarine tender  and the Submarine Division 12. From 1923 until 1926, he again returned to Annapolis as an instructor. From 1926 until 1928 he commanded Submarine Division 11. In 1929 Friedell completed a senior course and the Naval War College and became Head of the Department of Electric Engineering at Annapolis until the summer of 1931. While in command in 1937, he aided in the search for Amelia Earhart after her plane went missing. In November 1940 he took command of the Submarine Force, U.S. Fleet until January 1941. He served as the Commandant of Mare Island Naval Shipyard from early 1941 until 1944 when he took command of the Eleventh Naval District  and Naval Base San Diego. He retired in 1946 as a Rear Admiral. Admiral Friedell died January 27, 1958, at Naval Medical Center San Diego and was Buried at Rosecrans National Cemetery, San Diego, California.

References 

1883 births
1958 deaths
United States Navy rear admirals (upper half)
United States Naval Academy alumni
Recipients of the Navy Cross (United States)
United States Navy World War II admirals
United States submarine commanders
Sea captains